Fánk is a sweet traditional Hungarian donut. The most commonly used ingredients are: flour, yeast, butter, egg yolk, a little bit of rum, salt, milk and oil to deep fry with. After the pastry has risen for approximately 30 minutes the result is an extreme light doughnut-like pastry. Fánk is traditionally served with powdered sugar and lekvár, Hungarian thick jams; mostly apricot at that.

See also
 List of doughnut varieties

External links
 

Doughnuts
Hungarian desserts
Hungarian pastries